The 2010–11 Indiana Pacers season was Indiana's 44th season as a franchise and 35th season in the NBA. With a victory over the Washington Wizards on April 6, 2011, the Pacers clinched their first playoff berth since 2006.

However, a first round loss to eventual league MVP Derrick Rose and the top-seeded Chicago Bulls ended the season for the Pacers.

On January 30, head coach Jim O'Brien was fired. Replacing him was interim head coach Frank Vogel, who would be named as permanent during the lockout following the season.

2010 NBA Draft

Roster

Pre-season

Game log

|- bgcolor="#ffcccc"
| 1
| October 6
| @ Memphis
| 
| Roy Hibbert (18)
| Roy Hibbert (10)
| Darren Collison (5)
| FedExForum8,618
| 0–1
|- bgcolor="#ffcccc"
| 2
| October 8
| Orlando
| 
| Darren Collison (18)
| James Posey,Paul George (5)
| Roy Hibbert,Mike Dunleavy (2)
| Conseco Fieldhouse10,001
| 0–2
|- bgcolor="#ffcccc"
| 3
| October 9
| @ Houston
| 
| Roy Hibbert (17)
| Roy Hibbert (9)
| Darren Collison (4)
| Toyota Center12,469
| 0–3
|- bgcolor="#ccffcc"
| 4
| October 13
| Minnesota
| 
| Danny Granger (30)
| Roy Hibbert (14)
| Danny Granger,Roy Hibbert,A. J. Price (4)
| Conseco Fieldhouse9,177
| 1–3
|- bgcolor="#ccffcc"
| 5
| October 15
| New Orleans
| 
| Tyler Hansbrough (19)
| Josh McRoberts (8)
| Darren Collison (5)
| Conseco Fieldhouse10,758
| 2–3
|- bgcolor="#ccffcc"
| 6
| October 19
| @ Minnesota
| 
| Roy Hibbert (27)
| Roy Hibbert (16)
| Darren Collison (9)
| Target Center10,918
| 3–3
|- bgcolor="#ffcccc"
| 7
| October 22
| @ Chicago
| 
| Roy Hibbert,Darren Collison (14)
| Paul George (10)
| Darren Collison,Paul George,Jeff Foster (4)
| United Center21,126
| 3–4
|-

Regular season

Standings

Record vs. opponents

Game log

|- bgcolor="#ffcccc"
| 1
| October 27
| @ San Antonio
| 
| Roy Hibbert (28)
| Roy Hibbert (9)
| Darren Collison (7)
| AT&T Center18,581
| 0–1
|- bgcolor="#ccffcc"
| 2
| October 29    
| @ Charlotte
| 
| Danny Granger (33)
| Roy Hibbert (8)
| Darren Collison,Roy Hibbert (6)
| Time Warner Cable Arena18,351
| 1–1
|- bgcolor="#ccffcc"
| 3
| October 30
| Philadelphia
| 
| Danny Granger (22)
| Roy Hibbert (13)
| Roy Hibbert (5)
| Conseco Fieldhouse18,165
| 2–1
|-

|- bgcolor="#ffcccc"
| 4
| November 3
| @ Philadelphia
| 
| Darren Collison (11)
| Roy Hibbert (8)
| Danny Granger,Roy Hibbert,Darren Collison (3)
| Wells Fargo Center12,277
| 2–2
|- bgcolor="#ffcccc"
| 5
| November 5
| Milwaukee
| 
| Danny Granger,Darren Collison (19)
| Roy Hibbert (12)
| Roy Hibbert (4)
| Conseco Fieldhouse14,115
| 2–3
|- bgcolor="#ccffcc"
| 6
| November 9
| Denver
| 
| Mike Dunleavy (31)
| Josh McRoberts (10)
| Darren Collison,T. J. Ford (6)
| Conseco Fieldhouse11,122
| 3–3
|- bgcolor="#ffcccc"
| 7
| November 12
| Houston
| 
| James Posey (19)
| Roy Hibbert,Josh McRoberts (8)
| Mike Dunleavy (6)
| Conseco Fieldhouse14,414
| 3–4
|- bgcolor="#ccffcc"
| 8
| November 13
| @ Cleveland
| 
| Danny Granger (34)
| Roy Hibbert (13)
| Darren Collison,T. J. Ford (5)
| Quicken Loans Arena20,562
| 4–4
|- bgcolor="#ffcccc"
| 9
| November 16
| Atlanta
| 
| Danny Granger (22)
| Roy Hibbert (15)
| T. J. Ford (5)
| Conseco Fieldhouse11,133
| 4–5
|- bgcolor="#ccffcc"
| 10
| November 18
| L.A. Clippers
| 
| Danny Granger (22)
| Tyler Hansbrough,Roy Hibbert (8)
| A. J. Price (6)
| Conseco Fieldhouse12,459
| 5–5
|- bgcolor="#ffcccc"
| 11
| November 20
| Orlando
| 
| Roy Hibbert (19)
| Roy Hibbert (10)
| T. J. Ford (5)
| Conseco Fieldhouse14,583
| 5–6
|- bgcolor="#ccffcc"
| 12
| November 22
| @ Miami
| 
| Danny Granger,Brandon Rush (20)
| Danny Granger (11)
| Danny Granger (6)
| American Airlines Arena19,600
| 6–6
|- bgcolor="#ccffcc"
| 13
| November 23
| Cleveland
| 
| Danny Granger (24)
| Roy Hibbert,Josh McRoberts (7)
| Darren Collison (7)
| Conseco Fieldhouse12,629
| 7–6
|- bgcolor="#ffcccc"
| 14
| November 26
| Oklahoma City
| 
| Danny Granger (30)
| Mike Dunleavy,Roy Hibbert (10)
| Darren Collison (5)
| Conseco Fieldhouse17,155
| 7–7
|- bgcolor="#ccffcc"
| 15
| November 28
| @ L.A. Lakers
| 
| Roy Hibbert (24)
| Roy Hibbert (12)
| Roy Hibbert (6)
| Staples Center18,997
| 8–7
|- bgcolor="#ccffcc"
| 16
| November 30
| @ Sacramento
| 
| Danny Granger (37)
| Roy Hibbert (8)
| Darren Collison (6)
| ARCO Arena10,927
| 9–7
|-

|- bgcolor="#ffcccc"
| 17
| December 1
| @ Utah
| 
| Darren Collison (16)
| Danny Granger (7)
| Darren Collison,Josh McRoberts (5)
| EnergySolutions Arena18,732
| 9–8
|- bgcolor="#ffcccc"
| 18
| December 3
| @ Phoenix
| 
| Brandon Rush (21)
| Josh McRoberts (9)
| T. J. Ford (9)
| US Airways Center16,991
| 9–9
|- bgcolor="#ccffcc"
| 19
| December 6
| Toronto
| 
| Brandon Rush (26)
| Danny Granger (9)
| T. J. Ford,Roy Hibbert,Josh McRoberts (6)
| Conseco Fieldhouse11,930
| 10–9
|- bgcolor="#ffcccc"
| 20
| December 8
| @ Milwaukee
| 
| Danny Granger (26)
| Josh McRoberts (7)
| Josh McRoberts (5)
| Bradley Center12,789
| 10–10
|-bgcolor="#ccffcc"
| 21
| December 10
| Charlotte
| 
| Danny Granger (18)
| Roy Hibbert (14)
| Darren Collison (7)
| Conseco Fieldhouse13,128
| 11–10
|- bgcolor="#ffcccc"
| 22
| December 11
| @ Atlanta
| 
| Mike Dunleavy (16)
| Mike Dunleavy (9)
| Darren Collison (5)
| Philips Arena14,131
| 11–11
|- bgcolor="#ffcccc"
| 23
| December 13
| @ Chicago
| 
| T. J. Ford,Brandon Rush (13)
| Mike Dunleavy (8)
| T. J. Ford (4)
| United Center21,287
| 11–12
|- bgcolor="#ffcccc"
| 24
| December 15
| L.A. Lakers
| 
| Darren Collison (17)
| James Posey (7)
| Darren Collison,T. J. Ford (6)
| Conseco Fieldhouse18,165
| 11–13
|- bgcolor="#ccffcc"
| 25
| December 17
| Cleveland
| 
| Danny Granger (30)
| Danny Granger (12)
| Darren Collison (5)
| Conseco Fieldhouse12,021
| 12–13
|- bgcolor="#ffcccc"
| 26
| December 19
| @ Boston
| 
| Danny Granger (19)
| Roy Hibbert (14)
| T. J. Ford,James Posey (3)
| TD Garden18,624
| 12–14
|- bgcolor="#ccffcc"
| 27
| December 20
| New Orleans
| 
| Danny Granger (27)
| Jeff Foster (11)
| Darren Collison,T. J. Ford (5)
| Conseco Fieldhouse12,271
| 13–14
|- bgcolor="#ffcccc"
| 28
| December 26
| Memphis
| 
| Danny Granger (29)
| Roy Hibbert (10)
| Darren Collison,T. J. Ford (4)
| Conseco Fieldhouse12,630
| 13–15
|- bgcolor="#ffcccc"
| 29
| December 28
| Boston
| 
| Brandon Rush (17)
| Roy Hibbert (8)
| Danny Granger (4)
| Conseco Fieldhouse18,165
| 13–16
|- bgcolor="#ffcccc"
| 30
| December 29
| @ Washington
| 
| Mike Dunleavy (20)
| Danny Granger (9)
| Darren Collison (5)
| Verizon Center16,108
| 13–17
|- bgcolor="#ccffcc"
| 31
| December 31
| Washington
| 
| Darren Collison,Danny Granger (18)
| Roy Hibbert,Josh McRoberts (8)
| Darren Collison (6)
| Conseco Fieldhouse13,043
| 14–17
|-

|- bgcolor="#ffcccc"
| 32
| January 2
| @ New York
| 
| Danny Granger (25)
| Danny Granger (17)
| Darren Collison (6)
| Madison Square Garden19,763
| 14–18
|- bgcolor="#ffcccc"
| 33
| January 7
| San Antonio
| 
| Tyler Hansbrough (23)
| Roy Hibbert (14)
| Darren Collison (6)
| Conseco Fieldhouse14,157
| 14–19
|- bgcolor="#ffcccc"
| 34
| January 8
| @ Atlanta
| 
| Danny Granger (16)
| Mike Dunleavy,Roy Hibbert (7)
| T. J. Ford (6)
| Philips Arena13,547
| 14–20
|- bgcolor="#ccffcc"
| 35
| January 11
| @ Philadelphia
| 
| Danny Granger (27)
| Tyler Hansbrough (9)
| Darren Collison (13)
| Wells Fargo Center10,890
| 15–20
|- bgcolor="#ccffcc"
| 36
| January 12
| Dallas
| 
| Brandon Rush (20)
| Mike Dunleavy (11)
| Danny Granger (6)
| Conseco Fieldhouse11,204
| 16–20
|- bgcolor="#ffcccc"
| 37
| January 14
| Chicago
| 
| Danny Granger (22)
| Jeff Foster (15)
| Darren Collison (5)
| Conseco Fieldhouse18,165
| 16–21
|- bgcolor="#ffcccc"
| 38
| January 17
| @ L.A. Clippers
| 
| Danny Granger (32)
| Jeff Foster (8)
| Darren Collison (8)
| Staples Center15,863
| 16–22
|- bgcolor="#ffcccc"
| 39
| January 19
| @ Golden State
| 
| Danny Granger (32)
| Jeff Foster (15)
| Danny Granger (6)
| Oracle Arena18,185
| 16–23
|- bgcolor="#ffcccc"
| 40
| January 22
| @ Portland
| 
| Danny Granger (24)
| Roy Hibbert (10)
| Darren Collison (7)
| Rose Garden20,563
| 16–24
|- bgcolor="#ffcccc"
| 41
| January 23
| @ Denver
| 
| Tyler Hansbrough (27)
| Tyler Hansbrough (10)
| A. J. Price (8)
| Pepsi Center17,047
| 16–25
|- bgcolor="#ffcccc"
| 42
| January 26
| Orlando
| 
| Danny Granger (27)
| Jeff Foster (8)
| Darren Collison (4)
| Conseco Fieldhouse12,164
| 16–26
|- bgcolor="#ccffcc"
| 43
| January 28
| New Jersey
| 
| Mike Dunleavy (30)
| Jeff Foster,Roy Hibbert (6)
| Darren Collison (8)
| Conseco Fieldhouse11,337
| 17–26
|- bgcolor="#ffcccc"
| 44
| January 29
| @ Chicago
| 
| Josh McRoberts (20)
| Jeff Foster (10)
| Darren Collison (8)
| United Center21,611
| 17–27
|- bgcolor="#ccffcc"
| 45
| January 31
| Toronto
| 
| Roy Hibbert (24)
| Roy Hibbert (11)
| Darren Collison (6)
| Conseco Fieldhouse10,258
| 18–27
|-

|- bgcolor="#ccffcc"
| 46
| February 2
| @ Cleveland
| 
| Danny Granger (23)
| Roy Hibbert (10)
| Darren Collison (9)
| Quicken Loans Arena18,877
| 19–27
|- bgcolor="#ccffcc"
| 47
| February 4
| Portland
| 
| Danny Granger (25)
| Jeff Foster (13)
| Darren Collison (7)
| Conseco Fieldhouse11,778
| 20–27
|- bgcolor="#ccffcc"
| 48
| February 6
| @ New Jersey
| 
| Dahntay Jones (18)
| Jeff Foster (8)
| Danny Granger,Roy Hibbert,Darren Collison (4)
| Prudential Center13,167
| 21–27
|- bgcolor="#ffcccc"
| 49
| February 8
| @ Miami
| 
| Roy Hibbert (20)
| Roy Hibbert (10)
| Darren Collison (8)
| American Airlines Arena19,600
| 21–28
|- bgcolor="#ccffcc"
| 50
| February 9
| Charlotte
| 
| Roy Hibbert (29)
| Roy Hibbert (10)
| Josh McRoberts (7)
| Conseco Fieldhouse10,268
| 22–28
|- bgcolor="#ccffcc"
| 51
| February 11
| Minnesota
| 
| Danny Granger,Dahntay Jones (19)
| A. J. Price (8)
| Darren Collison (6)
| Conseco Fieldhouse12,559
| 23–28
|- bgcolor="#ccffcc"
| 52
| February 12
| @ Milwaukee
| 
| Danny Granger (30)
| Roy Hibbert (8)
| Roy Hibbert (6)
| Bradley Center17,046
| 24–28
|- bgcolor="#ffcccc"
| 53
| February 15
| Miami
| 
| Roy Hibbert (18)
| Danny Granger (9)
| Darren Collison,A. J. Price (5)
| Conseco Fieldhouse18,165
| 24–29
|- bgcolor="#ffcccc"
| 54
| February 16
| @ Detroit
| 
| Roy Hibbert (29)
| Josh McRoberts (12)
| Darren Collison (9)
| The Palace of Auburn Hills12,551
| 24–30
|- 
|- align="center"
|colspan="9" bgcolor="#bbcaff"|All-Star Break
|- bgcolor="#ccffcc"
| 55
| February 22
| @ Washington
| 
| Danny Granger (21)
| Danny Granger (10)
| Darren Collison (6)
| Verizon Center14,328
| 25–30
|- bgcolor="#ccffcc"
| 56
| February 23
| Detroit
| 
| Tyler Hansbrough (21)
| Tyler Hansbrough (12)
| Darren Collison (6)
| Conseco Fieldhouse12,214
| 26–30
|- bgcolor="#ffcccc"
| 57
| February 25
| Utah
| 
| Danny Granger (17)
| Danny Granger (9)
| Darren Collison (3)
| Conseco Fieldhouse16,205
| 26–31
|- bgcolor="#ffcccc"
| 58
| February 27
| Phoenix
| 
| Danny Granger (25)
| Jeff Foster (12)
| Danny Granger (6)
| Conseco Fieldhouse14,168
| 26–32
|-

|- bgcolor="#ccffcc"
| 59
| March 1
| Golden State
| 
| Danny Granger (27)
| Roy Hibbert (9)
| Roy Hibbert,Josh McRoberts (4)
| Conseco Fieldhouse9,557
| 27–32
|- bgcolor="#ffcccc"
| 60
| March 2
| @ Oklahoma City
| 
| Tyler Hansbrough (13)
| Roy Hibbert (12)
| Josh McRoberts (5)
| Oklahoma City Arena18,203
| 27–33
|- bgcolor="#ffcccc"
| 61
| March 4
| @ Dallas
| 
| Danny Granger (22)
| Roy Hibbert (8)
| Darren Collison,Lance Stephenson (6)
| American Airlines Center20,385
| 27–34
|- bgcolor="#ffcccc"
| 62
| March 5
| @ Houston
| 
| Tyler Hansbrough (17)
| Jeff Foster,Tyler Hansbrough (10)
| Lance Stephenson (5)
| Toyota Center14,965
| 27–35
|- bgcolor="#ffcccc"
| 63
| March 8
| Philadelphia
| 
| Tyler Hansbrough (26)
| Paul George (10)
| Dahntay Jones (4)
| Conseco Fieldhouse9,466
| 27–36
|- bgcolor="#ffcccc"
| 64
| March 9
| @ Minnesota
| 
| Tyler Hansbrough (21)
| Tyler Hansbrough (10)
| Darren Collison,Danny Granger,Roy Hibbert,Dahntay Jones,A. J. Price,Brandon Rush,Lance Stephenson (1)
| Target Center15,153
| 27–37
|- bgcolor="#ffcccc"
| 65
| March 11
| @ Toronto
| 
| Danny Granger (25)
| Paul George,Danny Granger,Tyler Hansbrough (7)
| Darren Collison (7)
| Air Canada Centre14,726
| 27–38
|- bgcolor="#ccffcc"
| 66
| March 13
| @ New York
| 
| Tyler Hansbrough (29)
| Tyler Hansbrough,Roy Hibbert (8)
| Darren Collison (8)
| Madison Square Garden19,763
| 28–38
|- bgcolor="#ccffcc"
| 67
| March 15
| New York
| 
| Tyler Hansbrough (30)
| Roy Hibbert (12)
| Darren Collison (9)
| Conseco Fieldhouse14,164
| 29–38
|- bgcolor="#ffcccc"
| 68
| March 16
| @ Boston
| 
| Paul George,Danny Granger (15)
| Tyler Hansbrough,Josh McRoberts (11)
| Darren Collison (9)
| TD Garden18,624
| 29–39
|- bgcolor="#ccffcc"
| 69
| March 18
| Chicago
| 
| Tyler Hansbrough (29)
| Tyler Hansbrough (12)
| Darren Collison (8)
| Conseco Fieldhouse18,165
| 30–39
|- bgcolor="#ffcccc"
| 70
| March 19
| @ Memphis
| 
| Darren Collison,Danny Granger (17)
| Jeff Foster (9)
| Paul George,Danny Granger,Dahntay Jones (2)
| FedExForum17,013
| 30–40
|- bgcolor="#ccffcc"
| 71
| March 21
| @ New Jersey
| 
| Roy Hibbert (24)
| Tyler Hansbrough (9)
| Darren Collison (12)
| Prudential Center13,792
| 31–40
|- bgcolor="#ccffcc"
| 72
| March 23
| @ Charlotte
| 
| Danny Granger (33)
| Roy Hibbert (14)
| Darren Collison,Roy Hibbert (4)
| Time Warner Cable Arena14,703
| 32–40
|- bgcolor="#ffcccc"
| 73
| March 25
| Sacramento
| 
| Danny Granger (20)
| Paul George,Tyler Hansbrough,Brandon Rush (8)
| Darren Collison,Tyler Hansbrough,A. J. Price (3)
| Conseco Fieldhouse13,813
| 32–41
|- bgcolor="#ffcccc"
| 74
| March 26
| @ Detroit
| 
| Brandon Rush (19)
| Tyler Hansbrough,Josh McRoberts (8)
| Darren Collison (6)
| The Palace of Auburn Hills19,216
| 32–42
|- bgcolor="#ccffcc"
| 75
| March 28
| Boston
| 
| Roy Hibbert (26)
| Jeff Foster (7)
| Danny Granger (4)
| Conseco Fieldhouse15,932
| 33–42
|- bgcolor="#ccffcc"
| 76
| March 30
| Detroit
| 
| Darren Collison (20)
| Josh McRoberts (13)
| Darren Collison,A. J. Price (3)
| Conseco Fieldhouse9,390
| 34–42
|-

|- bgcolor="#ccffcc"
| 77
| April 1
| Milwaukee
| 
| Danny Granger (17)
| Roy Hibbert (11)
| Darren Collison (7)
| Conseco Fieldhouse11,177
| 35–42
|- bgcolor="#ffcccc"
| 78
| April 3
| @ New Orleans
| 
| Mike Dunleavy,Danny Granger (15)
| Roy Hibbert (6)
| A. J. Price (6)
| New Orleans Arena13,898
| 35–43
|- bgcolor="#ccffcc"
| 79
| April 6
| Washington
| 
| Danny Granger (25)
| Paul George,Roy Hibbert (6)
| Darren Collison (11)
| Conseco Fieldhouse14,222
| 36–43
|- bgcolor="#ccffcc"
| 80
| April 8
| Atlanta
| 
| Danny Granger (28)
| Roy Hibbert (11)
| Darren Collison (10)
| Conseco Fieldhouse15,879
| 37–43
|- bgcolor="#ffcccc"
| 81
| April 10
| New York
| 
| Danny Granger (20)
| Roy Hibbert (10)
| Darren Collison (5)
| Conseco Fieldhouse13,542
| 37–44
|- bgcolor="#ffcccc"
| 82
| April 13
| @ Orlando
| 
| Mike Dunleavy,Brandon Rush (16)
| Tyler Hansbrough,Solomon Jones (6)
| A. J. Price (7)
| Amway Center19,169
| 37–45
|-

Playoffs

Game log

|- bgcolor=ffcccc
| 1
| April 16
| @ Chicago
| 
| Danny Granger (24)
| Roy Hibbert (8)
| Darren Collison (9)
| United Center22,986
| 0–1
|- bgcolor=ffcccc
| 2
| April 18
| @ Chicago
| 
| Danny Granger (19)
| Tyler Hansbrough,Josh McRoberts (6)
| Mike Dunleavy,Danny Granger (4)
| United Center22,480
| 0–2
|- bgcolor=ffcccc
| 3
| April 21
| Chicago
| 
| Danny Granger (21)
| Paul George (12)
| Darren Collison,Mike Dunleavy,Paul George,Danny Granger (2)
| Conseco Fieldhouse18,165
| 0–3
|- bgcolor=ccffcc
| 4
| April 23
| Chicago
| 
| Danny Granger (24)
| Danny Granger,Roy Hibbert (10)
| Danny Granger (4)
| Conseco Fieldhouse18,165
| 1–3
|- bgcolor=ffcccc
| 5
| April 26
| @ Chicago
| 
| Danny Granger (20)
| Tyler Hansbrough (11)
| Darren Collison (5)
| United Center22,822
| 1–4
|-

Player statistics

Season

Playoffs

Player Statistics Citation:

Transactions

Trades

Free agents

Additions

Subtractions

References

Indiana Pacers seasons
Indiana
Pace
Pace